Alattuchira is in Ernakulam district, Kerala, India, is situated 2 km east of Kodanad.

Location
Situated about 50 km from Kochi and 15 km away from Perumbavoor on the northern  side on the bank of the river Periyar. The nearest railway station is Angamaly (20 km) and Nedumbassery International Airport is 16 km from Alattuchira. Angamaly, Muvattupuzha, Kothamangalam, Aluva are towns situated close to Alattuchira, apart from Perumbavoor.

Education
St. Marys LP School & Bethlehem St. Marys Church are located in the heart of Alattuchira. St George Church Nedumpara is well known. Dhanya Arts and Sports club is the favourite hang out place of the people.

Tourism
The International Christian Pilgrim Center Malayattor and tourist spot Kodanad are close. Paniyely Waterfalls are 6 km away and Panumkuzhy is one km away.

Politics
Alattuchira comes under the Perumbavoor Legislative Assembly represented by Mr. Saju Paul since 2001 and comes under Chalakkudy Lokha Sabha Constituency. It is the border village of Koovappady Panchayath .

Transportation
The village is well connected with roads and private buses operating every 10 minutes to nearby towns. Alattuchira is inhabited mainly by people from Christian and Hindu communities.

Economy
The people of Alattchira are mainly into agriculture and cultivate  commodities like rice, rubber, pepper, ginger, turmeric, plantain, vegetables, coconut, nutmeg, and cocoa.

References 

Villages in Ernakulam district